Fintona Junction railway station served Fintona in  County Tyrone in Northern Ireland.

The Londonderry and Enniskillen Railway opened the station on 1 May 1856. It was taken over by the Great Northern Railway (Ireland) in 1883.

It closed on 1 October 1957.

References

Disused railway stations in County Tyrone
Railway stations opened in 1856
Railway stations closed in 1957
1856 establishments in Ireland
Railway stations in Northern Ireland opened in the 19th century